The 2022 Copa CONMEBOL Libertadores de Futsal was the 21st edition of the Copa Libertadores de Futsal, South America's premier club futsal tournament organized by CONMEBOL. The tournament was held in Buenos Aires, Argentina between 24 September and 2 October 2022 (originally scheduled from 30 April to 7 May 2022).

San Lorenzo were the defending champions.

Teams
The competition was contested by 12 teams: the title holders, one entry from each of the ten CONMEBOL associations, plus an additional entry from the host association.

Notes

Venue
The tournament was entirely played at the Microestadio Malvinas Argentinas (also knows as Befol Arena), owned by Argentinos Juniors, located in La Paternal neighborhood in Buenos Aires, Argentina.

Draw
The draw of the tournament was held on 29 August 2022, 12:00 PYT (UTC−4). The draw was conducted based on Regulations Article 16 as follows:

Initially, three teams were seeded and assigned to the head of the groups (San Lorenzo automatically to Group A, the others two via a draw from pot 1):

To Group A: as 2021 Copa Libertadores champions, San Lorenzo (Argentina)
To Group B: as the first representative of the host association, Barracas Central (Argentina)
To Group C: as the representative of the runner-up national association of the 2021 Copa Libertadores, Cascavel (Brazil)

The remaining nine teams were split into three pots of three based on the final placement of their national association's club in the previous edition of the championship, with the highest three (Venezuela, Peru and Paraguay) placed in Pot 2, the next three (Colombia, Uruguay and Chile) placed in Pot 3 and the lowest two (Ecuador and Bolivia) in pot 4, alongside the additional Argentine club. From each pot, the first team drawn was placed into Group A, the second team drawn placed into Group B and the final team drawn placed into Group C. Clubs from the same association could not be drawn into the same group.

The draw resulted in the following groups:

Squads

Each team had to enter a squad of a maximum of 14 and a minimum of 9 players, including at least two goalkeepers (Regulations Article 32).

Group stage
The top two teams of each group and the two best third-placed teams advance to the quarter-finals.

Tiebreakers
Teams are ranked according to points (3 points for a win, 1 point for a draw, 0 points for a loss). If tied on points, tiebreakers are applied in the following order (Regulations Article 21):
Results in head-to-head matches between tied teams (points, goal difference, goals scored);
Goal difference in all matches;
Goals scored in all matches;
Fewest red cards received;
Fewest yellow cards received;
Drawing of lots.

All match times are in PYT (UTC−4), as listed by CONMEBOL.

Group A

Order of matches was reverted from the original schedule.

Group B

Group C

Ranking of third-placed teams

Ranking of fourth-placed teams

Final stage
In the quarter-finals, semi-finals and final, extra time and penalty shoot-out would be used to decide the winner if necessary (no extra time would be used in the play-offs for third to twelfth place) (Regulations Article 22).

All match times are in PYT (UTC−4), except for the final matchday (2 October) which are in PYST (UTC−3).

Bracket
The quarter-final matchups are:
QF1: Winner Group A vs. 2nd Best Third Place
QF2: Winner Group B vs. 1st Best Third Place
QF3: Winner Group C vs. Runner-up Group A
QF4: Runner-up Group B vs. Runner-up Group C

The semi-final matchups are:
SF1: Winner QF1 vs. Winner QF4
SF2: Winner QF2 vs. Winner QF3

Quarter-finals

Semi-finals

5th–8th place

1st–4th place

Finals

11th place match

9th place match

7th place match

5th place match

3rd place match

Final

Final ranking

References

External links
CONMEBOL Libertadores Futsal Argentina 2022, CONMEBOL.com

2022
2022 in South American futsal
2022 in Argentine football
September 2022 sports events in South America
October 2022 sports events in South America
International futsal competitions hosted by Argentina